Baseball Manager is a 1963 pop art painting by Roy Lichtenstein. The magna on canvas measures 68 x 56 inches.  The painting is visible at Marlins Park (Promenade Level, Section 19), located in Miami, Florida.

See also
1963 in art

References

1963 paintings
Baseball culture
Paintings by Roy Lichtenstein
Portraits by American artists
Sports paintings